The Diocese of Chișinău is an eparchy or diocese of the Metropolis of Chișinău and All Moldova under the Moscow Patriarchate with its seat in the capital city of Moldova, Chișinău.

History

Prior to 1812 the Orthodox Church in eastern Moldavia or Bessarabia, modern day Moldova, was part of the Metropolis of Moldavia (under the Church of Constantinople). Following the annexation of Bessarabia by the Russian Empire in 1812, the Russian Orthodox Church established the Eparchy of Chişinău and Khotin under Metropolitan Gavril (Bănulescu-Bodoni) to care for the region's Orthodox Christians.

The Eparchy of Chişinău and Khotin remained part of the Russian Orthodox Church until Bessarabia's union with Romania in 1918, after which the Romanian Orthodox Church established jurisdiction over the territory following the expulsion of the then Archbishop of Chişinău, Anastasius (Gribanovsky), and reorganized the Eparchy as the Metropolis of Chişinău and Bessarabia.

In 1940, following the annexation of Bessarabia by the Soviet Union, the Moscow Patriarchate established in Chişinău a new Russian Orthodox eparchy, while the Metropolis of Bessarabia was forced to interrupt its activity.

Following Moldovan independence from the USSR, the Holy Synod of the Russian Orthodox Church granted the Church's eparchies in Moldova autonomy as the Moldovan Orthodox Church, with Archbishop Vladimir (Cantarean) of Chişinău becoming first hierarch of the Church of Moldova as Metropolitan of Chişinău and All Moldova.

Eparchy today
As of 2010 the Eparchy consisted of 610 parishes, 24 monasteries, and 5 sketes served by 730 full-time priests and 60 deacons. It continues to be led by Metropolitan Vladimir (Cantarean).

Bishops of Chișinău 
 Gavril Bănulescu-Bodoni (1812–1821)
 Demetrius (Sulima) (1821–1844)
 Irenarch (Popov) (1844–1858)
 Anthony (Shokotov) (1858–1871)
 Paul (Lebedev) (1871–1882)
 Sergius (Lyapidevsky) (1882–1891)
 Isaac (Polozensky) (1891–1892)
  (1892–1898)
 Iakov (Piatnitsky) (1898–1904)
 Vladimir (Sinkovsky) (1904–1908)
 Seraphim (Chichagov) (1908–1914)
 Platon (Rozhdestvensky) (1914–1915)
 Anastasius (Gribanovsky) (1915–1918)

References

External links
 Ion Nistor, Istoria Basarabiei, Humanitas, 1991. , p. 226-240
 Eparchy of Chişinău (Russian)
 Metropolia of Chişinău and All Moldova (Moldovan/Romanian)

Eparchies of the Russian Orthodox Church